Dragan Dragutinović (born 17 January 1980) is a Serbian retired footballer.

Career
Born in Čačak, his previous clubs were FK Borac Čačak, FK Vojvodina and FK Metalac Gornji Milanovac in the Serbian SuperLiga. In 2008, he played in the 2008–09 UEFA Cup with Borac Cacak against FC Dacia Chișinău, PFC Lokomotiv Sofia, and AFC Ajax. He later played with FC Okzhetpes in the Kazakhstan Premier League and later with FK Mladost Lučani in the Serbian First League. In 2013, he went abroad to play in the Canadian Soccer League with Serbian White Eagles FC. In 2018, he returned to play with the Serbian White Eagles for the 2018 season. He re-signed with the White Eagles for the 2019 season.

References

1980 births
Living people
Serbian footballers
Association football defenders
FK Borac Čačak players
FK Vojvodina players
FK Metalac Gornji Milanovac players
FK Mladost Lučani players
Serbian White Eagles FC players
Serbian SuperLiga players
FC Okzhetpes players
Canadian Soccer League (1998–present) players
Expatriate footballers in Kazakhstan
Expatriate soccer players in Canada
Serbian First League players
Kazakhstan Premier League players